The , known by the nickname "Ghost rockets", was an artillery weapon used by the Japanese military during World War II, especially during the Battle of Iwo Jima.

Specifications
The mortar consists of a steel tube closed at one end by a steel base-plate, which rests on a wooden platform. The range of each shot was adjusted by adding different size powder charges at the base of the round. The barrels could handle only five or six shots apiece before becoming damaged and unusable. When used in large groups, as was often done, it produced a fearsome effect known as the "screaming missile" to U.S. Marines. To absorb the massive recoil caused by firing their projectiles, the mortar tubes were almost always placed up against a mound of dirt.

Use
During World War II, the Japanese Imperial Army deployed somewhere between one and two dozen 320 mm mortars on Iwo Jima, as well as two dozen on Bataan. The weapon was also used on Okinawa. One Type 98 was captured by British forces at Imphal.

Iwo Jima
Japanese officers believed the 320 mm spigot mortar's most effective method of employment was to inflict psychological damage on the American troops instead of inflicting casualties. The mortars were operated mainly by the 20th Independent Mortar Battalion.

During the Iwo Jima campaign, many of the 12 to 24 launchers were placed inside the mouths of caves to protect them from American artillery bombardment, requiring the gun crews to live in the caves that housed their guns, like the infantry. Due to the relative difficulty involved in moving such a massive weapon system, their locations usually remained fixed during battles.

Photo Gallery

References

Bibliography 

 

Spigot mortars
World War II field artillery
9
320 mm artillery
Military equipment introduced in the 1930s